Dinesh Kumar may refer to:

Dinesh Kumar (bowls) (born 1977), Indian international lawn bowler
Dinesh Kumar (boxer) (born 1988), Indian boxer
Dinesh Kumar (choreographer) (born 1975), Indian choreographer
Dinesh Kumar (cyclist), Indian cyclist at events such as 2022 Commonwealth Games